The Baudó oropendola (Psarocolius cassini) is a species of bird in the family Icteridae. It is endemic to Colombia. Its natural habitat is subtropical or tropical moist lowland forests, which are threatened by destruction. As it is only known from a small number of locations, its conservation status has been assessed as "endangered" by the IUCN.

Description
This bird is similar in appearance to the black oropendola (Psarocolius guatimozinus), being largely black with chestnut-brown upper parts, but the patches of bare skin on the cheeks are pink, the mantle and wings are more rufous-brown and the flanks are rather more chestnut.

Distribution
The bird has only been observed in a few isolated locations in river valleys at the edge of humid rainforests, but more recently birds have been sighted in the river valleys of the Rio Siviru and Rio Tipicay near Bajo Baudó, and a location has been found on the coastal plain with sixty inactive nests suspended from Bactris gasipaes palms and Guazuma ulmifolia trees in secondary growth between a banana plantation and the edge of the mature forest.

Status
The International Union for Conservation of Nature has assessed the conservation status of P. cassini as being "endangered"; this is because of the small number of locations from which it is known, and the degradation of its habitat as deforestation takes place for logging, the creation of oil palm plantations, agricultural activities and road-building. It is estimated that the total population of the bird numbers between 1000 and 2500 individuals and is likely to be declining. However the bird is little-known, and there may be other breeding colonies at present unknown; if that proves to be the case, the bird's status may need to be changed to "vulnerable".

References

External links
 Baudo Oropendola Psarocolius cassini – BirdLife International

Baudó oropendola
Endemic birds of Colombia
Baudó oropendola
Baudó oropendola
Taxonomy articles created by Polbot